Westmead railway station is located on the Main Western line, serving the Sydney suburb of Westmead. It is served by Sydney Trains T1 Western Line and T5 Cumberland Line services and NSW TrainLink Blue Mountains Line services.

History

Westmead station opened in March 1883. To the east of the station lies a dive through which one of the eastbound tracks passes. This was opened in 1986 as part of the quadruplication of the Main Western line between Westmead and Granville. It was necessary because west of Westmead the two westbound tracks run adjacent to one another as do the two eastbound tracks. East of Westmead, the lines are configured to run as West/East/West/East.

Between 1922 and 1932, the Rogans Hill line branched from the Main Western line immediately to the west of Westmead station.

Platforms & services

Westmead station is served by two NightRide routes:
N70: Penrith to Town Hall station
N71: Richmond to Town Hall station

The station will be the future terminus of the Parramatta Light Rail. and also the Sydney Metro West which is scheduled to open by 2030.

Trackplan

References

External links

Westmead station details Transport for New South Wales
Westmead Station Public Transport Map Transport for NSW
Westmead Metro station Sydney Metro

Easy Access railway stations in Sydney
Main Western railway line, New South Wales
Railway stations in Sydney
Railway stations in Australia opened in 1883
City of Parramatta